Helen Getachew is Ethiopian beauty pageant titleholder who was crowned Miss Universe Ethiopia 2012, and represented Ethiopia at the 2012 Miss Universe pageant.

Miss Universe 2012
Getachew participated in the 61st edition of the Miss Universe pageant and was unplaced.

References

External links
Official Miss Universe Ethiopia website

Living people
Ethiopian beauty pageant winners
People from Addis Ababa
Miss Universe 2012 contestants
Ethiopian female models
Year of birth missing (living people)